William Frederick, Prince of Wied (27 June 187218 June 1945) was a German nobleman, eldest child of William, Prince of Wied. He was an elder brother of William, Prince of Albania.

Early life

Prince William Frederick of Wied was born at Neuwied near Koblenz, in the Prussian Rhineland, a province of the Kingdom of Prussia. He was the first child of William, Prince of Wied (1845–1907; son of Hermann, Prince of Wied and Princess Marie of Nassau) and his wife, Princess Marie of the Netherlands (1841–1910; daughter of Prince Frederick of the Netherlands and his wife Princess Louise of Prussia). He was descended from George II of Great Britain through both his parents. His great-grandparents were William I of the Netherlands and Frederick William III of Prussia. He was a nephew of Queen Elisabeth of Romania.

Marriage
William Frederick married on 29 October 1898 in Stuttgart, Princess Pauline of Württemberg (1877–1965), only daughter of King William II of Württemberg and his first wife, Princess Marie of Waldeck and Pyrmont, daughter of George Victor, Prince of Waldeck and Pyrmont. The couple had two children:

Hermann, Hereditary Prince of Wied (18 August 1899 – 5 November 1941); married Countess Marie Antonia of Stolberg-Wernigerode and had issue, including Frederick William, Prince of Wied, who married Princess Guda, daughter of Josias, Hereditary Prince of Waldeck and Pyrmont.
Prince Dietrich of Wied (30 October 1901 – 8 June 1976); married Countess Antoinette Julia Grote and had issue.

Prince of Wied
William Frederick inherited the title of Prince of Wied after the death of his father in 1907. After the German Revolution in 1919 all nobility titles were abolished. He became the titular Prince, or Fürst, until his death in 1945, upon which the title was inherited by his 14-year-old grandson Frederick William (1931–2000). His son Hermann had predeceased him, having died of wounds received in action during World War II in Rzeszów, Poland.

Honours
He received the following orders and decorations:

Ancestry

Notes

References
The Royal House of Stuart, London, 1969, 1971, 1976, Addington, A. C., Reference: 336

1872 births
1945 deaths
People from Neuwied
House of Wied-Neuwied
German princes
Albanian nobility
Recipients of the Order of the Netherlands Lion
Grand Crosses of the Order of the Crown (Romania)
Commanders Grand Cross of the Order of the Polar Star
Annulled Honorary Knights Grand Cross of the Royal Victorian Order